In enzymology, an erythritol kinase is an enzyme that catalyzes the chemical reaction

ATP + erythritol  ADP + D-erythritol 4-phosphate

Thus, the two substrates of this enzyme are ATP and erythritol, whereas its two products are ADP and D-erythritol 4-phosphate.

This enzyme belongs to the family of transferases, specifically those transferring phosphorus-containing groups (phosphotransferases) with an alcohol group as acceptor.  The systematic name of this enzyme class is ATP:erythritol 4-phosphotransferase. This enzyme is also called erythritol kinase (phosphorylating).

Structural studies

As of late 2007, only one structure has been solved for this class of enzymes, with the PDB accession code .

References

 
 

EC 2.7.1
Enzymes of known structure